Jenel Lausa (born August 1, 1988) is a Filipino professional boxer and a mixed martial artist who was known to have competed in the Flyweight division of the Ultimate Fighting Championship.

Mixed martial arts career 
Lausa made his professional debut in Asia's first professional MMA promotion, URCC, in 2011 as a flyweight.

In 2013, he signed with Pacific Xtreme Combat (PXC). He compiled a record of 5 wins and 1 loss and a flyweight championship, with 4 straight wins before signing with the UFC.

Ultimate Fighting Championship 
Lausa was scheduled to make his promotional debut on October 15, 2016 against Yao Zhikui at UFC Fight Night 97. However, due to the cancellation of the event, Lausa's match with Yao was moved to a later event at UFC Fight Night 101 on November 27, 2016. Lausa won the fight by unanimous decision.

Lausa faced promotional newcomer Magomed Bibulatov on April 8, 2017 at UFC 210. He lost the fight via unanimous decision.

Lausa was expected to face Naoki Inoue on September 23, 2017 at UFC Fight Night 117. However, Inoue pulled out on September 9 due to a dislocated shoulder. As a result, Lausa was removed from the card and is expected to be rescheduled against a new opponent at a future event.

Lausa faced Eric Shelton on November 19, 2017 at UFC Fight Night: Werdum vs. Tybura. He lost the fight by unanimous decision.

Lausa was scheduled to face Ashkan Mokhtarian  on June 13, 2018 at UFC Fight Night 132. However, it was reported on May 2, 2018 that Mokhtarian pulled from the fight citing injury and he is replaced by Ulka Sasaki. Lausa lost the fight in round two via a rear-naked choke submission. He was released by the UFC on June 24, 2018.

BRAVE CF 
Lausa returned to MMA after taking two years to focus on boxing to face Ryskulbek Ibraimov at BRAVE CF 47 on March 11, 2021. He lost the fight via unanimous decision.

Lausa next appeared at UAE Warriors 28 against Abdula Aliev on March 26, 2022. He lost the bout via technical decision after being unable to continue in the third round due to a groin strike.

Lausa faced Dansheel Moodley on November 26, 2022 at BRAVE CF 66, losing the bout via unanimous decision.

Championships and accomplishments
Pacific Xtreme Combat
Flyweight Champion (One time)

Mixed martial arts record

|-
|Loss
|align=center|7–8
|Dansheel Moodley
|Decision (unanimous)
|Brave CF 66
|
|align=center|3
|align=center|5:00
|Bali, Indonesia
|
|-
|Loss
|align=center|7–7
|Abdula Aliev
|Technical Decision (unanimous)
|UAE Warriors 28
|
|align=center|3
|align=center|0:23
|Abu Dhabi, United Arab Emirates
|
|-
|Loss
|align=center|7–6
|Ryskulbek Ibraimov
|Decision (unanimous)
|Brave CF 47
|
|align=center|3
|align=center|5:00
|Arad, Bahrain
|
|-
|Loss
|align=center|7–5
|Ulka Sasaki
|Submission (rear-naked choke)
|UFC Fight Night: Cowboy vs. Edwards
|
|align=center|2
|align=center|4:04
|Kallang, Singapore
|
|-
|Loss
|align=center|7–4
|Eric Shelton
|Decision (unanimous)
|UFC Fight Night: Werdum vs. Tybura
|
|align=center|3
|align=center|5:00
|Sydney, Australia
|
|-
|Loss
|align=center|7–3
|Magomed Bibulatov
|Decision (unanimous)
|UFC 210
|
|align=center|3
|align=center|5:00
|Buffalo, New York, United States 
|
|-
| Win
| align=center| 7–2
| Yao Zhikui
| Decision (unanimous)
| UFC Fight Night: Whittaker vs. Brunson
| 
| align=center| 3
| align=center| 5:00
| Melbourne, Australia
| 
|-
| Win
| align=center| 6–2
| Crisanto Pitpitunge
| Decision (split)
| Pacific Xtreme Combat 51
| 
| align=center| 5
| align=center| 5:00
| Parañaque, Philippines
| 
|-
| Win
| align=center| 5–2
| Ernesto Montilla
| KO (punch)
| Pacific Xtreme Combat 48
| 
| align=center| 1
| align=center| 4:59
| Pasig, Philippines
| 
|-
| Win
| align=center| 4–2
| Dean Bermudez
| Submission (guillotine choke)
| Pacific Xtreme Combat 46
| 
| align=center| 1
| align=center| 3:06
| Pasig, Philippines
| 
|-
| Win
| align=center| 3–2
| Venson Delopere
| Decision (unanimous) 
| Pacific Xtreme Combat 43
| 
| align=center| 3
| align=center| 5:00
| Pasig, Philippines
| 
|-
| Loss
| align=center| 2–2
| Ernesto Montilla
| Decision (unanimous)
| Pacific Xtreme Combat 41
| 
| align=center| 3
| align=center| 5:00
| Pasig, Philippines
| 
|-
| Win
| align=center| 2–1
| Adam Cacay
| TKO (referee stoppage)
| Pacific Xtreme Combat 39
| 
| align=center| 3
| align=center| 4:45
| Pasig, Philippines
| 
|-
| Loss
| align=center| 1–1
| Joseph Amurao
| Submission (rear-naked choke)
| Team Lakay Wushu Xanda - MMA Eliminations 5: Machines
| 
| align=center| 2
| align=center| N/A
| Benguet, Philippines
| 
|-
| Win
| align=center| 1–0
| Ramie Crisostomo
| Submission (guillotine choke)
| Universal Reality Combat Championship: Bacolod Brawl 2011
| 
| align=center| 1
| align=center| 6:50
| Bacolod, Philippines
|

Professional boxing record 

|-
| style="text-align:center;" colspan="10"|10 Wins (6 knockouts, 4 decisions), 0 Loss, 1 Draws
|-  style="text-align:center; background:#e3e3e3;"
|  style="border-style:none none solid solid; "|Res.
|  style="border-style:none none solid solid; "|Record
|  style="border-style:none none solid solid; "|Opponent
|  style="border-style:none none solid solid; "|Type
|  style="border-style:none none solid solid; "|RoundTime
|  style="border-style:none none solid solid; "|Date
|  style="border-style:none none solid solid; "|Location
|  style="border-style:none none solid solid; "|Notes
|- align=center
|Win||10–0–1||align=left| Carlos Lopez
|
|
|
|align=left|
|align=left|
|- align=center
|Win||9–0–1||align=left| Angelito Merin 
|
|
|
|align=left|
|align=left|
|- align=center
|Win||8–0–1||align=left| Rolly Llino 
|
|
|
|align=left|
|align=left|
|- align=center
|Draw||7–0–1||align=left| Jhunriel Ramonal
|
|
|
|align=left|
|align=left|
|- align=center|- align=center
|Win||7–0||align=left| Jon Jon Estrada
|
|
|
|align=left|
|align=left|
|- align=center
|Win||6–0||align=left| Roy Lagrada
|
|
|
|align=left|
|align=left|
|- align=center
|Win||5–0||align=left| Jeson Berwela
|
|
|
|align=left|
|align=left|
|- align=center
|Win||4–0||align=left| Benjie Baron
|
|
|
|align=left|
|align=left|
|- align=center
|Win||3–0||align=left| Marco Niones
|
|
|
|align=left|
|align=left|
|- align=center
|Win||2–0||align=left| Mark Lester Gasta
|
|
|
|align=left|
|align=left|
|- align=center
|Win||1–0||align=left| Albert Campilan
|
|
|
|align=left|
|align=left|

See also
 List of current UFC fighters
 List of male mixed martial artists

References

External links

1988 births
Living people
Sportspeople from Iloilo City
Filipino male mixed martial artists
Flyweight mixed martial artists
Mixed martial artists utilizing boxing
Filipino male boxers
Bantamweight boxers
Ultimate Fighting Championship male fighters
21st-century Filipino people